Mu Se Township is a township of Mu Se District in the Shan State of eastern Burma. The principal town and administrative center is Muse. It is the terminus of Mandalay-Lashio-Muse road.

Geography
Muse is the biggest border trading point between Myanmar and China. It is the home of the Muse (105 Miles) Trading Zone. The trading zone is 370 acres wide and it is 6 miles from Muse. It was opened in April 2006. Ruili is the Chinese town opposite to Muse. Pang Hseng (Kyu Koke) and Mong Ko (Monekoe) are other important towns in the area.

Further reading
 Myanmar: IDP Sites in Kachin and northern Shan States - Mimu

See also
Muse, Burma

References

External links
 "Muse Township - Shan State" Map, 14 June 2010, Myanmar Information Management Unit (MIMU)

Townships of Shan State